The Henri-Nannen-Schule, formerly Hamburger Journalistenschule, is the journalist school of Europe's largest publishing house, Gruner + Jahr (Brigitte, GEO, Stern), German weekly Die Zeit and national news magazine Der Spiegel. Its seat is Hamburg and it is considered one of the best schools of journalism in Germany, along with the German School of Journalism in Munich.

History

The Henri-Nannen-Schule was founded in 1978 on initiative of the late Henri Nannen, founding editor of the German news magazine Stern. Wolf Schneider, a renowned journalist, later language style critic and author, became its first director.

Education

The Henri-Nannen-Schule offers aspiring and experienced journalists a broad 18 months education encompassing magazine, newspaper, online, radio and television. Its curriculum consists of both four internships at major media outlets organised by the school (9 months) and seminars (8 months) given by experienced journalists with varying specialities – including politics, arts and culture, religion, science, education, business and economics, investigative reporting, national and international affairs. All of them are preeminent in their fields, and many have won numerous journalism awards.

Admission

Every 18 months, the Henri-Nannen-Schule selects 18 in a two-phase-procedure. The applicants minimum qualifications are the command of the German language, both spoken and written; the former age limit of 27 no longer exists. First, applicants are asked to research and write a report and a comment. The best 60 of usually 1,500 applicants are subsequently invited to turn in a personal letter and a CV. They are invited to Gruner+Jahr headquarters in Hamburg, where they research and write another report, edit news, sit a general knowledge and a picture test and pass a personal interview with a jury of preeminent editors and reporters. Tuition is free and all students receive a monthly stipend.

Prominent Alumni

 Nikolaus Blome, vice editor-in-chief of Bild
 Jan Fleischhauer, columnist at Der Spiegel and Focus
 Peter-Matthias Gaede, editor-in-chief of GEO
 Christoph Keese, Senior Vice President Investor Relations and Public Affairs, Axel Springer AG
 Peter Kloeppel, anchorman and editor-in-chief of RTL Television
 Stefan Kornelius, senior editor for foreign policy at Süddeutsche Zeitung
 Ildikó von Kürthy, German bestseller writer
 Souad Mekhennet, author of leading German and American papers
 Mathias Müller von Blumencron, editor-in-chief of digital products at Frankfurter Allgemeine Zeitung
 Petra Reski, journalist and author
 Marcel Rosenbach, reporter at Der Spiegel, Journalist of the Year (2013)
 Wulf Schmiese, anchorman at ZDF Television
 Cordt Schnibben, editor at Der Spiegel
 Thomas Urban, correspondent at Süddeutsche Zeitung  
 Sonja Zekri, editor at Süddeutsche Zeitung

References

External links
 website of Henri-Nannen-Schule, in German
 Portrait of Henri-Nannen-Schule on Gruner + Jahr website, in English
 Goethe Institut on Journalism in Germany, in English
 Der Spiegel, English online edition

Journalism schools in Germany
Education in Hamburg
Educational institutions established in 1978
1978 establishments in West Germany